Benton High School may refer to:
Benton Central Junior-Senior High School in Benton County, Indiana
Benton Consolidated High School in Benton, Illinois
Benton High School (Arkansas) in Benton, Arkansas
Benton High School (Louisiana) in Benton, Louisiana
Benton High School (Missouri) in Saint Joseph, Missouri
Benton High School (Wisconsin) in Benton, Wisconsin
Benton High School (Mississippi) in Yazoo County, Mississippi